Robert Herrick (baptised 24 August 1591 – buried 15 October 1674) was a 17th-century English lyric poet and Anglican cleric. He is best known for Hesperides, a book of poems. This includes the carpe diem poem "To the Virgins, to Make Much of Time", with the first line "Gather ye rosebuds while ye may".

Early life
Born in Cheapside, London, Robert Herrick was the seventh child and fourth son of Julia Stone and Nicholas Herrick, a prosperous goldsmith. He was named after an uncle, Robert Herrick (or Heyrick), a prosperous Member of Parliament (MP) for Leicester, who had bought the land Greyfriars Abbey stood on after Henry VIII's dissolution in the mid-16th century. Nicholas Herrick died in a fall from a fourth-floor window in November 1592, when Robert was a year old (whether this was suicide remains unclear). 

The tradition that Herrick received his education at Westminster is based on the words "beloved Westminster" in his poem "Tears to Thamesis", but the allusion is to the city, not the school. It is more likely that he, like his uncle's children, attended The Merchant Taylors' School. In 1607 he became apprenticed to his other uncle, Sir William Herrick, a goldsmith and jeweller to the king. The apprenticeship ended after only six years, when Herrick, aged 22, gained admission at St John's College, Cambridge. He later migrated to Trinity Hall, graduating in 1617. Herrick became a member of the Sons of Ben, a group centred on an admiration for the works of Ben Jonson, to whom he wrote at least five poems. Herrick was ordained into the Church of England in 1623 and in 1629 became the vicar of Dean Prior in Devonshire.

Civil War
In 1647, in the wake of the English Civil War, Herrick was ejected from his vicarage for refusing the Solemn League and Covenant. He returned to London to live in Westminster and depend on the charity of his friends and family. He spent some time preparing his lyric poems for publication and had them printed in 1648 under the title Hesperides; or the Works both Human and Divine of Robert Herrick, with a dedication to the Prince of Wales.

Restoration and later life
When King Charles II was restored to the throne in 1660, Herrick petitioned for his own restoration to his living. He had obtained favour by writing verses celebrating the births of both Charles II and his brother James before the Civil War. Herrick became the vicar of Dean Prior again in the summer of 1662 and lived there until his death in October 1674, at the age of 83. His date of death is unknown, but he was buried on 15 October.

Herrick was a bachelor all his life. Many of the women he names in his poems are thought to be fictional. He is buried in the churchyard of St George the Martyr parish church, Dean Prior.

Poetic style and stature

Herrick wrote over 2,500 poems, about half of which appear in his major work, Hesperides. Hesperides also includes the much shorter Noble Numbers, his first book of spiritual works, first published in 1648. He is well known for his style, and in his earlier works for frequent references to lovemaking and the female body. His later poetry was of a more spiritual and philosophical nature. Among his most famous short poetical sayings are the unique monometers, such as number 475, "Thus I / Pass by / And die,/ As one / Unknown / And gone."

Herrick sets out his subject-matter in the poem he printed at the beginning of his collection, "The Argument of his Book". He dealt with English country life and its seasons, village customs, complimentary poems to various ladies and his friends, themes taken from classical writings, and a solid bedrock of Christian faith, not intellectualized but underpinning the rest. It has been said of Herrick's style that "his directness of speech with clear and simple presentation of thought, a fine artist working with conscious knowledge of his art, of an England of his youth in which he lives and moves and loves, clearly assigns him to the first place as a lyrical poet in the strict and pure sense of the phrase."

Herrick never married and none of his love poems seems to connect directly with any one woman. He loved the richness of sensuality and the variety of life. This appears vividly in such poems as "Cherry-ripe", "Delight in Disorder" and "Upon Julia's Clothes".

The overriding message in Herrick's work is that life is short, the world beautiful and love splendid. We must use the short time we have to make the most of it. This message is clear in "To the Virgins, to make much of Time", "To Daffodils", "To Blossoms" and "Corinna's Going A Maying", where the warmth and exuberance of a seemingly kind and jovial personality comes over.

The opening stanza in one of his more famous poems, "To the Virgins, to Make Much of Time", runs:

This is an example of the carpe diem genre, whose popularity Herrick's poems helped to revive.

His poems were none too popular on publication. A style influenced by Ben Jonson, the classical Roman writers and the late Elizabethan era must have seemed old-fashioned to an audience tuned to the complexities of metaphysical poets such as John Donne and Andrew Marvell. His work was rediscovered in the early 19th century and has been regularly printed since.

The Victorian poet Swinburne described Herrick as "the greatest song writer ever born of English race". Despite his use of classical allusions and names, Herrick's poems are easier for modern readers than those of many of his contemporaries.

In literature
Herrick appears in James Branch Cabell's "Concerning Corrina", published in his 1916 short-story volume The Certain Hour: Dizain des Poëtes. The story strongly suggests that the poet was an adept of the dark arts. Though technically a mystery or horror story, it is best classed as a philosophical comedy.

Herrick is a major character in Rose Macaulay's 1932 historical novel They Were Defeated.

Samuel Beckett's play Happy Days has the character Winnie quote from Herrick's "To the Virgins to Make Much of Time".

In Ken Bruen's debut novel Rilke on Black makes Herrick's two-line poem "Dreams" a favorite with the protagonist Nick. Robert Herrick is one of many historical characters in the alternate history series 1632. The dedication in Thomas Burnett Swann's Will-o-the-Wisp (1976) is "A novel suggested by the life of Robert Herrick, poet, vicar, and pagan". Herrick was referred to by the character Clement in HBO's 'Industry' (December 2020), in view of a candle on a birthday cake representing the passing of precious time.

In music
The first composers to set Herrick to music were near-contemporaries: at least 40 settings of 31 poems appear in manuscript and printed songbooks of 1624–1683, by Henry and William Lawes, John Wilson, Robert Ramsey and others. It is clear from references within Hesperides that many other settings have not survived. 

In the early 20th century Herrick's verse became popular with a range of composers. One of them, Fritz Hart, was by far the most prolific, with more than 120 settings composed throughout his life, mostly collected in Fourteen Songs, Op. 10 (1912), Twenty-One Songs, Op. 23 (1916), Twenty Five Songs in five sets, Opp. 50–54 (1922), Nine Sets of Four Songs Each, Opp. 82–90 (1930), Three Sets of Five Songs, Opp. 148–150 (1941), and Two Sets of Five Songs, Opp. 166–167 (1948). 

Other settings from this period include:
Arnold Bax: To Daffodils; Eternity
Lennox Berkeley: How love came in
Havergal Brian: The Mad Maid's Song; Why dost thou wound, and break my heart?; The Night Piece
Frank Bridge: The Primrose; The Hag; Fair Daffodils
Benjamin Britten: Spring Symphony (To Violets); Five Flower Songs (To Daffodils; The Succession of the Four Sweet Months)
Benjamin Burrows: Upon Love; The Olive Branch; The Wounded Cupid; To Music
Samuel Coleridge-Taylor: The Guest (Scena)
Walford Davies: Eternity; Noble Numbers, Op. 28 (Weigh me the fire; God's Dwelling; Grace for a Child; What Sweeter Music)
Frederick Delius To Daffodils
George Dyson: To Music
John Foulds: To Music
Ivor Gurney: To Violets; Lullaby
Joseph Holbrooke: To Dianeme
Herbert Howells: Here she lies, a pretty bud
Peter Hurford: Litany to the Holy Spirit
Hubert Parry: Julia
Roger Quilter: To Julia, Op. 8 (The Bracelet; The Maiden Blush; To Daisies; The Night Piece; Julia's Hair; Cherry Ripe). To Electra; Tulips
Alan Rawsthorne: To Daffodils
Charles Villiers Stanford: To Carnations; To the Rose; A Welcome Song; To Music
 Robert Still: To Julia; Upon Julia's Clothes
Ralph Vaughan Williams: To Daffodils (two settings)
Peter Warlock: Two Short Songs (I held love's head; Thou gav'st me leave to kiss)
 Leslie Woodgate: The White Island

See also

Country house poems

References

Further reading
Elizabeth H. Hageman, Robert Herrick: A Reference Guide (Boston: G. K. Hall, 1983)
George Walton Scott, Robert Herrick, 1591–1674 (London: Sidgwick & Jackson, 1974)
Gordon Braden, "Robert Herrick and Classical Lyric Poetry," in his The Classics and English Renaissance Poetry: Three Case Studies (New Haven: Yale University Press, 1978), pp. 154–254
Ann Baynes Coiro, Robert Herrick's "Hesperides" and the Epigram Book Tradition (Baltimore: Johns Hopkins University Press, 1988)
Robert L. Deming, Ceremony and Art: Robert Herrick's Poetry (The Hague & Paris: Mouton, 1974)
T. S. Eliot, "What Is Minor Poetry?," in his On Poetry and Poets (New York: Farrar, Straus & Cudahy, 1957), pp. 34–51
Achsah Guibbory, "Robert Herrick: 'Repullulation' and the Cyclical Order," in her The Map of Time: Seventeenth-Century English Literature and Ideas of Pattern in History (Urbana: University of Illinois Press, 1986), pp. 137–167
John L. Kimmey, "Order and Form in Herrick's Hesperides," Journal of English and Germanic Philology, 70 (Spring 1971): 255–268.
Kimmey, "Robert Herrick's Persona," Studies in Philology, 67 (April 1970): 221–236
Kimmey, "Robert Herrick's Satirical Epigrams," English Studies, 51 (August 1970): 312–323
F. W. Moorman, Robert Herrick: A Biographical and Critical Study (London: John Lane, 1910; New York: Russell & Russell, 1962)

S. Musgrove, The Universe of Robert Herrick, Auckland University College Bulletin, no. 38, English Series, no. 4 (Auckland: Pelorus Press, 1958)
Roger B. Rollin and J. Max Patrick, eds., "Trust to Good Verses": Herrick Tercentenary Essays (Pittsburgh: University of Pittsburgh Press, 1978)
Louise Schleiner, "Herrick's Songs and the Character of "Hesperides," English Literary Renaissance, 6 (Winter 1976): 77–91
Claude J. Summers, "Herrick's Political Counter-plots," SEL: Studies in English Literature 1500–1900, 25 (Winter 1985): 165–182
Harold Toliver, "Herrick's Book of Realms and Moments," English Literary History, 49 (Summer 1982): 429–448
Thomas R. Whitaker, "Herrick and the Fruits of the Garden," English Literary History, 22 (March 1955): 16–33

External links

Chrysomela: A Selection from the Lyrical Poems of Robert Herrick
Upon Kings. Poems Upon Several Personages of Honour ...
The Complete Poetry of Robert Herrick (with full biography) Site at Newcastle University for the new edition of Herrick's Poetry
Robert Herrick, The Poetry Foundation
Britannica.com: Robert Herrick
Luminarium: "The Life of Robert Herrick"
Texts by Robert Herrick on IMSLP

1591 births
1674 deaths
People educated at Merchant Taylors' School, Northwood
Alumni of St John's College, Cambridge
Alumni of Trinity Hall, Cambridge
People from the City of London
People educated at Westminster School, London
English male poets
16th-century English poets